is a former Japanese football player.

Club career
Honda was born in Kitajima, Tokushima on February 25, 1976. After he dropped out of Chukyo University, he joined the Nagoya Grampus Eight in 1995. However he played less than Yuji Ito. He moved to the Bellmare Hiratsuka in 1999, and debuted at the club. He returned to Nagoya in 2000. However he played second to Japan national team goalkeeper Seigo Narazaki. He then moved to Vissel Kobe in August 2004. However he played second string to Makoto Kakegawa and Kota Ogi. He moved to the J2 League club Thespa Kusatsu in 2007. He played many matches as a regular goalkeeper. In 2009, his playing time decreased due to an injury and he retired at the end of the 2009 season.

National team career
In April 1995, Honda was selected Japan U-20 national team for 1995 World Youth Championship. He played 2 matches.

Club statistics

References

External links

1976 births
Living people
Chukyo University alumni
Association football people from Tokushima Prefecture
Japanese footballers
Japan youth international footballers
J1 League players
J2 League players
Nagoya Grampus players
Shonan Bellmare players
Vissel Kobe players
Thespakusatsu Gunma players
Association football goalkeepers